Terry Wapi is a Papua New Guinea international rugby league footballer who plays as a  for the Papua New Guinea Hunters in the Queensland Cup.

Career
Wapi made his international debut for Papua New Guinea in their 24-6 defeat by Samoa in the 2019 Oceania Cup.

References

External links
PNG Hunters profile

1996 births
Living people
Papua New Guinea Hunters players
Papua New Guinea national rugby league team players
Papua New Guinean rugby league players
Rugby league fullbacks
Rugby league wingers